The Battle of Lypovec was an armed clash fought between the Slovak Mobile Brigade (Slovenské rýchlé brigády) and troops of the Red Army on 22 July 1941 in the set of Operation Barbarossa. It was the first battle of Slovakia with the Red Army.

The Battle 
The Soviet defense on the cross of the San River was the unit of the 10th Fortified area of 12th Army. The defense of Lypovets was led by 44th Rifle Division under the command of General Semyon Tkachenko. This division consisted of two fresh regiments (305th and 319th) and part of two infantry regiments already exhausted by the fighting (25th and 295th). Its combat role was to delay the advance of the enemy. 
The Mobile Brigade, with fewer than 5,000 soldiers, 43 tanks and 123 guns, managed to occupy Lypovets, but then the brigade ran into the 44th Rifle Division of the Red Army. Because the Slovak tanks had run out of fuel, the Slovak soldiers came under heavy pressure and the catastrophe was avoided by artillery support, which managed to decimate the Soviets enough to allow the Slovak soldiers to retreat.

The Slovak Rychlé brigády lost 5 tanks: three  LT vz. 35, one LT vz. 38 and one LT vz. 40. Plus one OA vz.30 armored car.

Aftermath 
The Slovaks suffered 261 casualties: 75 killed, 167 wounded, 2 POWs and 17 MIA, while the Soviets had 600 between killed and wounded. The Rychlé brigády had not had enough force to defeat a stronger enemy in pre-prepared positions. The reluctance of Slovak soldiers to fight against the Soviet Union was also manifested by the first defectors to the Soviet side, who were reported missing in official reports. The mechanical staff had enough technical means to repair all of the battalion vehicles, but under the influence of anti-fascist and pro-Czechoslovak officers, they had withdrawn all vehicles and the whole battalion to Slovakia on the pretext that they can not be repaired under field conditions. The rest of the brigade was assigned to the German 295. Infanterie-Division. 
 
General Josef Turanec wrote in his diary: "The Brigade is basically cowardly, as soon as the Russians open fire, they run away. The officers are in the back of the attack, but during retreat in the front rows." The Germans themselves had a similar assessment, noting that Slovak soldiers were very sensitive to artillery fire and were fleeing.

References

References 

Literature 

 MIČIANIK, P.: Slovenská armáda v ťažení proti Sovietskemu zväzu I. (1941–1944). V operácii Barbarossa. Banská Bystrica 2007.
 MIČIANIK, Pavel. Úteky Slovákov zo sovietskeho zajatia I. [online]. Historia nostra, 13.5.2007. Dostupné online (sk)
 MIČIANIK, Pavel. Slováci proti Molotovovej línii I. [online]. druhasvetova.sk, 1.12.2006. Dostupné online
 Plukovník generálneho štábu Rudolf Pilfousek. 27.3.2007. Dostupné online
 Slovenská armáda v boji o Lypovec

Slovakia during World War II
Lypovec
Lypovec
Lypovec
Russia–Slovakia relations